MUNUS, 𒊩, or SAL is the capital-letter (majuscule) Sumerogram for the Akkadian language word "ṣuhārtu", young woman, or woman. The word is commonly used in the Amarna letters diplomatic letters, as well as elsewhere, for example in the Epic of Gilgamesh.

Epic of Gilgamesh
The cuneiform character for woman, or "young woman", has many alternative uses in the Epic of Gilgamesh; it is used for the following: mim, (21 times); rag, (2); rak, (10); raq, (1); sal, (1); šal, (25); MÍ, (43 times).

References

Further reading 
 
Rainey, 1970. El Amarna Tablets, 359-379, Anson F. Rainey, (AOAT 8, Alter Orient Altes Testament 8, Kevelaer and Neukirchen -Vluyen), 1970, 107 pages.

Sumerian words and phrases
Sumerograms
Cuneiform signs